Eduard Zakharov (10 January 1975 – 13 May 1997), with the full name Eduard Fyodorovich Zakharov, was a male boxer from Russia. He represented his native country at the 1996 Summer Olympics in Atlanta, Georgia, where he was stopped in the quarterfinals of the men's light-welterweight division (– 63,5 kg) by Cuba's eventual gold medalist Héctor Vinent. 

On 13 May 1997 Zakharov died from stab wounds in the Siberian town of Ukhta,  at the age of 22.

References

1975 births
1997 deaths
Light-welterweight boxers
Boxers at the 1996 Summer Olympics
Olympic boxers of Russia
Male murder victims
People murdered in Russia
Russian murder victims
Russian male boxers